Fengxiang District, formerly, Fengxiang County and its ancient name is Yong county (雍县), is a district administered by Baoji City in the west of Shaanxi province, China. The Fengxiang's government's seat is in Chengguan Town.

History
The city of Yōng located in Fengxiang District, was once the capital of the ancient State of Qin during the Zhou Dynasty (1046–256 BCE). As Yong's population expanded over time, the surrounding area became Yong County. During the Tang Dynasty (618–907 CE), a prefectural seat of government was established and renamed Fengxiang County, although people continued to use the old name. Under the Tang, it also served as Xidu, the "Western Capital" of the empire.

Fengxiang was the capital of the Qi Kingdom (907–924).

Geography and Climate
It is located in a sub-humid climate to temperate zones. Sunlight remains until 21:00 hours, and it has a frost-free period of 209 days. Its soil is small oil-based, and in the vast region of the south, there is deep soil, with good cultivation for major grain and cotton production. The hilly area north of the mountains to the river contains more than 1,000 river valleys with silt soil.

Administrative divisions
As 2020, Fengxiang District is divided to 12 towns.
Towns

Economy
The district produces a GDP 1.48251 billion yuan, with total retail sales of 385.41 million yuan, the balance of savings deposits of urban and rural residents of 1.04604 billion yuan. It has a financial income of 43.43 million yuan, with 72.85 million yuan in financial expenditure. Industries include farming machinery manufacturing, breweries, cement, ceramics, chemicals, machine brick, sugar, flour, and food processing. Natural resources include mines, and mineral resources are limestone, fire-resistant stone, calcite, iron, lignite, and so on. The highway network includes  of roads.

Agriculture
Main food crops include wheat, with Shaanxi Province is one of the main producing areas; sorghum, corn and beans are followed by other economic crops such as cotton, pepper and tobacco. Farmers in the district has an output of 1,301 yuan per capita net.

Culture and tourism
The district's specialty, Xifeng Jiu baijiu, is well known at home and abroad. Other handicraft include woodcut New Year pictures, clay sculptures, paper cuttings, fireworks paper guns, lacquer, Fung grass, straw hats, and others. Main tourist attractions include East Lake Park, Gu Cheng, Yin Fung Chi which was built in the Song Dynasty, Weeping Willow Lake in Xiangying, beautiful, the tomb of Qin Mugong south of the mound, and three Yong City Qindou sites, all provincial-level key heritage conservation units.

The East Lake Park (Donghu Gongyuan) can be dated back to 1062, when Su Shi, who was a judge in Fengxiang at the time, had a drinking water pond dredged out, creating the East Lake Park. The park has a similar pedestrian causeway as the famous Hangzhou West Lake, which was also created by him.

See also
 Fengxiang clay sculpture

External links
 http://www.fengxiang.gov.cn/ (Fengxiang district government website)
 https://web.archive.org/web/20100415163348/http://fengxiang.mofcom.gov.cn/ (Fengxiang MOFCOM)
 The Yongcheng Site of Qin is located in the south of Fengxiang District, Shaanxi Province

References

Districts of Shaanxi
Baoji